Siva Rao or Sivarao is an Indian surname. People with this surname include:

 Digavalli Venkata Siva Rao, lawyer and writer
 Kavuri Samba Siva Rao, politician, engineer and industrialist

Indian given names